The Roman Catholic Diocese of Nagoya is a diocese of the Western Latin Rite of the Catholic Church that is centered in the city of Nagoya and is part of the ecclesiastical province of Roman Catholic Archdiocese of Osaka 大阪 in Japan.

History
On February 18, 1922, the Apostolic Prefecture of Nagoya was formed out of the Apostolic Prefecture of Niigata and Metropolitan Archdiocese of Tōkyō.  Forty years later, on April 16, 1962, the apostolic prefecture was elevated to diocese.

Leadership
The current bishop is Michael Gorō Matsuura who was formerly an auxiliary bishop of the Archdiocese of Osaka, and the titular bishop of Sfasferia.  He was appointed by Pope Francis on Sunday, March 29, 2015, succeeding Augustinus Jun-ichi Nomura.

 Prefects Apostolic of Nagoya: 
 Fr. Joseph Reiners (ヨゼフ・ライネルス), S.V.D. (1922.02.18 – 1941)
 Bishop Peter Magoshiro Matsuoka (ペトロ松岡孫四郎) (1941 – 1962.04.16)
 Bishops of Nagoya:
 Bishop Peter Magoshiro Matsuoka (ペトロ松岡孫四郎) (1962.04.16 – 1969.06.26)
 Bishop Aloysius Nobuo Soma (アロイジオ相馬信夫) (1969.06.26 – 1993.04.05)
 Bishop Augustinus Jun-ichi Nomura (アウグスチノ野村純一) (1993.04.05 - 2015.03.29)
 Bishop Michael Gorō Matsuura (2015.03.29 - present)

See also
Roman Catholicism in Japan

References

Sources
 GCatholic.org

External links 
 Diocese website
 http://www.cbcj.catholic.jp/jpn/diocese/nagoya.htm

Roman Catholic Diocese of Nagoya
Roman Catholic dioceses in Japan
Christian organizations established in 1922
Roman Catholic dioceses and prelatures established in the 20th century